The Cross was a nightclub in York Way Goods Yard, King's Cross, London, England between 1993 and 2007, closing on New Year's Day 2008.

The club was started  by Billy Reilly and Keith Reilly (the subsequent founder of Fabric), who had originally wanted to open a pre-club drinks bar next to Bagleys nightclub. Camden Council however granted the Reilly brothers a full dance licence and they started hosting club events at the Cross, immediately attracting a well-dressed crowd and a cult-like following.

Image 

The Cross was known for long-running promoter residencies, such as Glitterati, the Italian-themed Vertigo and progressive house superclub Renaissance.  DJs such as Danny Rampling, Dave Seaman, Ian Ossia, Nigel Dawson and Judge Jules became established residents and names such as Paul van Dyk and BT (musician) appeared before they became major stars in their own right.

The club's bar-counters were made of steel and frosted glass and the outside terrace area had cobble-stones, couches and day-beds covered in velvet.  Club-goers were equally well-dressed, representing a significant break from the cheesier clubs common in London in the early 1990s.

Impact 

The Cross was revered as a step-change in the London nightclub scene, which had previously been dominated by unglamorous and at times dangerous venues.

Looking back over the club's history in 2008, Billy Reilly commented:

In the early days in particular we had the most beautiful people coming to the Cross,’ he says, recalling nights like Glitterati and Cheeky People, L’Amour and Milk ’n’ 2 Sugars. ‘I'd be surrounded by gorgeous girls who’d laugh at my bad jokes and tell me how wonderful I was and I'd look at them and think I'd died and gone to heaven. You've got to remember, one Saturday I had a garage and no one wanted to talk to me, the following week I had a club and everybody wanted to be my friend. You could make a film about it: from oily fingers and overalls, suddenly it was Patrick Cox and furry trousers.

References

External links 
https://www.thecrosslondon.com/
https://www.instagram.com/thecrossldn/

 Official Facebook group

1993 establishments in England
Nightclubs in London
2008 disestablishments in England
Defunct nightclubs in the United Kingdom